Mustapha Chadili (born 14 February 1973 in Casablanca) is a retired Moroccan football goalkeeper who played for Raja Casablanca.

Chadili played for Raja Casablanca at the 2000 FIFA Club World Championship.

He played for the Morocco national football team and was a participant at the 1998 FIFA World Cup.

Honors
Raja Casablanca
Moroccan League (7): 1996, 1997, 1998, 1999, 2000, 2001, 2004
Coupe du Trône (3): 1996, 2002, 2005 
CAF Champions league (2): 1997, 1999 runner-up: 2002
Afro-Asian Club Championship: 1998
CAF Confederation Cup: 2003
CAF Super Cup: 2000 runner-up : 1998

AS FAR
Coupe du Trône: 2009

Individual 
 Best goalkeeper in CAF Champions League (3): 1997, 1999, 2002
 Best goalkeeper in Moroccan League (2):  2001, 2003
 The only goalkeeper in African history to have kept a clean sheet in 13 consecutive matches
 The Moroccan goalkeeper with the most titles and the second in Africa

References

1973 births
Living people
Moroccan footballers
Footballers from Casablanca
Morocco international footballers
1998 FIFA World Cup players
2000 African Cup of Nations players
Association football goalkeepers
Raja CA players
Moghreb Tétouan players
Botola players